Hisaab Khoon Ka is a 1989 Indian Hindi-language film directed by Surendra Mohan, starring Mithun Chakraborty, Raj Babbar, Poonam Dhillon,   Mandakini in leas roles.

Plot
Hisaab Khoon Ka is an Shocking Suspense Thriller film with  Mithun Chakraborty and Raj Babbar playing the lead roles, supported by Poonam Dhillon, Mandakini, Satish Shah, Saeed Jaffrey and Amrish Puri.

Cast
Mithun Chakraborty as Suraj
Raj Babbar as Rajesh
Poonam Dhillon as Anu/Anita (Double Role) 
Mandakini as Preet Kaushal
Amrish Puri as CBI Inspector Ranveer Pushp
Bindu as Kiran
Saeed Jaffrey as Diwan
Gulshan Grover as Kuldeep Kaushal
Om Shivpuri as Dharampal
Sushma Seth as Rajmata
Satish Shah as Nandlal Patialewala
Tiku Talsania as Satpal

Music

External links
 

1989 films
1980s Hindi-language films
Indian action films
Films scored by Nadeem–Shravan
1989 action films
Films directed by Surendra Mohan